Ball Aerospace & Technologies Corp. is an American manufacturer of spacecraft, components and instruments for national defense, civil space and commercial space applications. The company is a wholly owned subsidiary of Ball Corporation (NYSE: BALL), with primary offices in Boulder, Colorado, and facilities in Broomfield and Westminster in Colorado, with smaller offices in New Mexico, Ohio, northern Virginia, Missouri and Maryland.

Ball Aerospace began building pointing controls for military rockets in 1956 (the aerospace part of the Ball Corporation was then known as Ball Brothers Research Corporation) and later won a contract to build some of NASA's first spacecraft, the Orbiting Solar Observatory satellites. The company has been responsible for numerous technological and scientific projects and continues to provide aerospace technology to NASA and related industries.

Other products and services for the aerospace industry include lubricants, optical systems, star trackers and antennas. As a wholly-owned subsidiary of the Ball Corporation, Ball Aerospace was cited in 2022 as the 61st largest defense contractor in the world.  Both parent and subsidiary headquarters are co-located in Broomfield, Colorado.

Participating projects 
 The Orbital Express autonomous satellite servicing mission
 The WorldView-2 Earth observation satellite.
 AEROS (satellite)
 Ralph (New Horizons instrument)
 Chandra X-ray Observatory aspect camera (star tracker) and SIM (science instrument module)
 Hubble Space Telescope: seven science instruments (COS, WFC3, ACS, NICMOS, STIS, COSTAR, and GHRS), two star trackers, five major equipment subsystems, and custom tools to support service missions
 James Webb Space Telescope optical mirror system

References

External links 
 Ball Aerospace website

Ball Corporation
Aerospace companies of the United States
Defense companies of the United States
Spacecraft manufacturers
Manufacturing companies based in Colorado
Companies based in Boulder, Colorado
Companies based in Broomfield, Colorado
Manufacturing companies established in 1956
1956 establishments in Colorado
Science and technology in Colorado
American companies established in 1956